Popoli is an comune and town in the province of Pescara in the Abruzzo region of Italy.

Popoli may also refer to:

 Popoli (magazine), international magazine of the Jesuits in Italy
 Popoli, Kastoria, historical region in Kastoria regional unit
 Giacinto de Popoli, Italian painter of the Baroque period

See also 

 Pepoli